Prior to the 1997 general election, various organisations carried out opinion polling to gauge voting intentions. Results of such polls are displayed in this list.

The date range for these opinion polls is from the previous general election to the election on 1 May 1997.

Most opinion polls do not cover Northern Ireland, since its 18 seats were not contested by the political parties standing for election in the rest of the United Kingdom.

Graphical summary 
By the end of 1992 Labour had established a lead over the Conservatives which lasted until the 1997 election.

Results

1997

1996

1995

1994

1993

1992

Subnational polling

Scotland
All poll data from BBC News.

References

1997 United Kingdom general election
Opinion polling for United Kingdom general elections
Opinion polling for United Kingdom votes in the 1990s